The State Development Corporation of Selangor or Perbadanan Kemajuan Negeri Selangor (PKNS) is a state development corporation in Selangor, Malaysia.

Sports
PKNS FC

External links
PKNS (Selangor State Development Corporation) website

Companies based in Selangor
Government of Selangor
Government-owned companies of Malaysia
Privately held companies of Malaysia